The Barony of Holckenhavn was a Danish majorat on the island of Funen, which existed from 1671 to 1921.

History 

The Barony of Holckenhavn was established on 4 October 1671 by King Christian V of Denmark for Eiler Holck, a member of the noble family of Holck. It consisted of the manor of Holckenhavn. The holder of the barony carried the title of enfeoffed baron.

The county was inherited by members of the Holck family during its entire existence. It was dissolved in 1921.

Notes and references

Bibliography

External links 
 Official website of Holckenhavn Castle

1671 establishments in Denmark
1921 disestablishments in Denmark
Danish noble titles